Ponometia candefacta, the olive-shaded bird-dropping moth, is a moth of the family Noctuidae. It is found in North America, where it has been recorded from the northern United States to southern Mexico. It has been introduced to Russia as a biological control agent of Ambrosia artemisiifolia. The habitat consists of dry, weedy, disturbed areas at low elevations.

The wingspan is 18–22 mm. The forewings are white near the base and along the costa, with grey and yellowish mottling in the median and subterminal areas. The hindwings are pale whitish grey, becoming gradually darker grey to the margin on the outer half. Adults are on wing in summer, from April to September.

The larvae feed on Asteraceae, including Aster and Ambrosia species. They are green with a white lateral stripe.

References

Moths described in 1831
Acontiinae
Lepidoptera used as pest control agents